Farrokhroo Parsa (24 March 1922 – 8 May 1980) was an Iranian physician, educator, and parliamentarian.

She served as minister of education under Amir Abbas Hoveida and was the first female cabinet minister. Parsa was an outspoken supporter of women's rights in Iran.

Farrokhroo Parsa was executed by firing squad on 8 May 1980 in Tehran, at the outset of the Islamic Cultural Revolution.

Biography

Farrokhroo Parsa was born on 24 March 1922 in Qom to Zoroastrian parents Farrokh-Din and Fakhr-e Āfāgh Pārsāy. Her mother, Fakhr-e Āfāgh, was the editor of the women's magazine Jahān-e Zan, and a vocal proponent for gender equality and for educational opportunities for women. Her views on this subject met with opposition of the conservative sections of the society of her time, leading to the expulsion of the family by the government of Ahmad Qavām, from Tehran to Qom, where Fakhr-e Āfāgh was placed under house arrest. It was here that Farrokhroo was born, some minutes past midnight on Iranian New Year's Eve 1922 (Nowruz, 1301 AH). Later, with the intervention of Prime Minister Hasan Mostowfi ol-Mamalek, her family was allowed to return to Tehran.

Upon obtaining a medical degree, Parsa became a biology teacher in Jeanne d'Arc High School in Tehran. At the school she came to know Farah Diba, one of her students at this school, and who would later become wife of King Mohammad Reza Pahlavi.

In 1963, Parsa was elected to parliament (the Majles), and began  petitioning Mohammad Reza Pahlavi for suffrage for Iran's women. She was also a driving force for legislation that amended the existing laws concerning women and family. In 1965 Pārsā was appointed Deputy Minister of Education and on 27 August 1968 she became Minister of Education in the cabinet of the Amir-Abbas Hoveyda. It was the first time in the history of Iran that a woman occupied a cabinet position.

Following the Iranian Revolution, Parsa was arrested and tried by the Islamic Revolutionary Court for allegedly "plundering the national treasury," "causing corruption and spreading prostitution" in the Ministry of Education, "collaborating with SAVAK" and "dismissing combatant educators from the Ministry of Education," and "being involved in passing anti-people laws". Although Parsa was allowed to make statements in her own defense in the second session of her trial, there was no indication that she was allowed to question those who testified against her, and there is no mention of defense witnesses. Parsa was executed by firing squad on 8 May 1980 in Tehran,

In her last letter from prison, Farrokhroo Parsa wrote to her children: "I am a doctor, so I have no fear of death. Death is only a moment and no more. I am prepared to receive death with open arms rather than live in shame by being forced to be veiled. I am not going to bow to those who expect me to express regret for fifty years of my efforts for equality between men and women. I am not prepared to wear the chador and step back in history."

Her successor as the Education Minister of Iran, Manouchehr Ganji another minister before the Islamic revolution, expressed surprise at her execution: she was "a lady, [...]Doctor, a competent physician who entertained good relations at the Ministry with revolutionaries like Beheshti, Bahonar, and Rejaii."
In fact, during her tenure as minister of education, Beheshti, Bahonar and Mohammed Mofatteh were on the ministry's payroll. These three were to be major players in the Islamic Revolution several years later. With her ministry's funding, Beheshti established the Islamic Center of Hamburg and Bahonar was able to set up a few Islamic public schools around Tehran.

See also
 Women's rights movement in Iran
 Women's rights in Iran
 Women in Iran

References

External links

 A photograph of Farrokhroo Parsa in conversation with Amir-Abbās Hoveydā.
 An old photograph of the young family of Farrokh-Din Pārsā and Fakhr-e Āfāgh Pārsāy.

1922 births
1980 deaths
Members of the 22nd Iranian Majlis
Iranian women activists
Iranian women's rights activists
Iranian feminists
People executed by Iran by firing squad
Iranian women physicians
Executed Iranian women
Deaths by firearm in Iran
People from Qom
20th-century Iranian women politicians
20th-century Iranian politicians
Rastakhiz Party politicians
Iran Novin Party politicians
Women government ministers of Iran
Politicians executed during the Iranian Revolution
20th-century Iranian physicians
20th-century Iranian women